Alfonso Rodríguez was a Spanish mariner and merchant, who was colonizer in the cities of Río de Janeiro and Buenos Aires in 1620s. He served as Captain of commercial ships, having an active participation in the commerce of Río de la Plata towards the middle of the 17th century.

He was born in Galicia, Spain, son of Juan de Trovo Rodríguez and Inés de Vasanta. He arrived in the Río de la Plata in the early 1600s from Rio de Janeiro, where he had lived a few years. Installed in Buenos Aires he participated in the economic activities of the Río de la Plata as a naval merchant.

He was married in Buenos Aires, to Ana de la Trinidad Martínez, daughter of Juan Gil de Freytas and María Martínez, possibly belonging to families established in the City during the second foundation of Buenos Aires by Juan de Garay. His wife's family was linked to Manuel de Frías, a distinguished military man born in Asunción, who held various political posts in the Río de la Plata, including that of lieutenant governor of Buenos Aires.

His wife Ana de la Trinidad Martínez y Gil de Freytas were the direct maternal ancestor (mitochondrial line) of distinguished Argentine politicians and military, including Juan Lucio Somoza, Sinforoso Amoedo, Juan Manuel Bayá, Apolinario Linera, Juan José Canaveris and Miguel Gerónimo de Esparza y Rodríguez. She was possibly the granddaughter of Francisco Martínez and Juana Luys de Luque, granddaughter in turn of Magdalena Elvira Hernández de los Reyes, a Spanish woman, married in Asunción to the Conquistador Benito Luys de Figueroa, born in Porto.

References

External links 
 Bautismos 1635-1636, 1640

People from Buenos Aires
People from Galicia (Spain)
17th-century Spanish businesspeople
Spanish colonial governors and administrators